Luis Avilés may refer to:
 Luis Avilés (footballer) (born 1990), Argentinian footballer
 Luis Avilés (athlete) (born 2002), Mexican sprinter